Jonai Bazar is a City in Dhemaji district in the Indian state of Assam.

Demographics
 India census, Jonai Bazar had a population of 5172. Males constitute 53% of the population and females 47%. Jonai Bazar has an average literacy rate of 65%, higher than the national average of 59.5%: male literacy is 74%, and female literacy is 56%. In Jonai Bazar, 16% of the population is under 6 years of age.

References

Cities and towns in Dhemaji district